Doug Davies (13 October 1930 – 24 March 1991) was an Australian rules footballer who played with Geelong in the Victorian Football League (VFL).

Davies was a reserve in Geelong's 1948 seconds premiership team and won a Gardiner Medal in 1950. His appearances in the seniors were limited, after playing eight games in his first season he added just four more over the next two years. A rover, he won another Gardiner Medal in 1955, while captain-coach. This gave him the distinction of being the first player to win the award twice. He then went on to play with Geelong West.

References

1930 births
Australian rules footballers from Victoria (Australia)
Geelong Football Club players
Geelong West Football Club players
Newtown & Chilwell Football Club players
1991 deaths